Azerbaijan National Carpet Museum (formerly called the Azerbaijan Carpet Museum) is a museum located in Baku that displays Azerbaijani carpets and rugs with historical and modern weaving techniques and materials. It has the largest collection of Azerbaijani carpets in the world. First opened on Neftchiler Avenue in 1967, it moved to a new building on the Baku's seafront park in 2014.

History

The museum was established in 1967 and was initially located in the Juma Mosque in Icheri Sheher. The mosque was built in the 15th century and renovated in the 19th century. Its first exhibition was held in 1972. In 1992, after the collapse of USSR, the museum was moved to the second floor of what is now the Baku Museum Center, a building that had originally been the Lenin museum. The collection was named in honour of the carpet designer Latif Karimov.

Plans to move the collection to a new purpose-built began in 2010, and a new building was due to open in late 2012 with a visit being made by President Ilham Aliyev in September 2013. The museum opened on 26 August 2014, as the Azerbaijan Carpet Museum, dropping its much longer official title.

Building

The structure of the building is intended to look like a rolled carpet. Designed by Austrian architect Franz Janz, the building took over six years to construct. The previous structure, a building of historical significance, was destroyed to make way for the new building.

Collection
The collection of the museum includes over 10,000 items of ceramics, metal works of the 14th century, jewellery from the Bronze Age, carpets and carpet items from the 17th-20th centuries, national garments and embroidery, and applied art works of the Modern Age. 
The museum organizes public lectures and study courses on carpets and applied arts. It has a book store selling books on Azerbaijani crafts and carpet art. The museum also holds a permanent collection from the Shusha Museum of History, from the city of Shusha. Some of the exhibited items from the Shusha museum were part of 600 carpets moved out of the museum before Shusha was captured by Armenian troops in 1992. They are now displayed at the museum in an exhibition titled "Burned Culture". In July 2022, the museum presented its newest exhibit, the Lampa carpet, originally woven in Shusha during the 1930s.

International exhibitions
The museum does research and public service work. Every year, state and international exhibitions are organized and catalogues on carpets are printed by the museum. The museum has also held exhibitions in more than 30 countries including France, Germany, England, Japan, the Netherlands. In 1998, the museum participated in a UNESCO-organized exhibition in Paris dedicated to Fuzûlî and in 1999 dedicated to the 1,300th anniversary of the Book of Dede Korkut and displayed carpets, folk applied art items, including copper jugs, mugs, buckets and saddlebags.

Ideological background

According to the peer-reviewed International Journal of Heritage Studies, the basis of classification and exhibition in the carpet museum of Baku is rooted in several factors, such as the geographical indicators associated with regional carpets, which reflect the development of a new type of state-sponsored national consciousness in the 1950s during the existence of the Azerbaijan SSR of the Soviet Union. During de-Stalinization, the Central Committee of the Azerbaijan Communist Party approved reforms aimed at defining and encouraging Azerbaijani history and culture, as well as replacing Russian with Azerbaijani as the constituent state language of the Azerbaijan SSR. Much of the contemporaneous Baku Central Committee had been active in Iran in the 1940s as part of the Soviet occupation, and its members firmly believed that Iran's Azerbaijan region historically belonged to their nation. The controversial decision to replace Russian with Azerbaijani as the official state language of the Azerbaijan SSR was also implemented partly in response to its Transcaucasian rivals, the Armenian and Georgian SSRs, who had already made their own native languages official in their respective republics in 1936 after the dissolution of the Transcaucasian SFSR. This period was also when the designation Azerbaijani replaced Turk in official usage. The issue of Karabakh was brought up again during de-Stalinization, with the Armenians of the predominantly Armenian-populated Nagorno-Karabakh Autonomous Oblast requesting unification with the Armenian SSR. All such cultural initiatives from the Azerbaijan SSR emerged in an environment of relative freedom of expression; a rise of nationalism in the Caucasus region; a fixation on Iran's Azerbaijan region; as well as a surge in rivalry with its Transcaucasian Soviet neighbors, especially Armenia, over "national rights and territory". The International Journal of Heritage Studies notes:

and:

The third level of the museum, which is devoted to Latif Karimov, presents and acknowledges Karimov as the "undisputed authority in the science and art of carpet weaving, thereby establishing the accuracy of the exhibitions thorough the scientific standing of Karimov". On the museum's second level there is a specific woven piece meant to reflect Karimov's classification and groupings of carpets, which the International Journal of Heritage Studies describes as "perhaps the most striking exhibit, in so far as territorial claims are concerned". On the piece, "under the banner of Azerbaijani carpet, various forms, motifs and artistic commonalities between Azerbaijan and other nations and ethnicities, including Iranians and Armenians are claimed and appropriated."

See also
Azerbaijan State Museum of Art
Azerbaijan State Museum of History

References

External links
 Azerbaijan Carpet Museum at Google Cultural Institute
 Azerbaijani Carpets
 Carpet Weaving in Azerbaijan 

Art museums and galleries in Azerbaijan
Museums in Baku
Azerbaijani rugs and carpets
Folk art museums and galleries
Rugs and carpets
Textile museums
Art museums established in 1967
1967 establishments in Azerbaijan